Josiah Abavu is a Papua New Guinean rugby league footballer who represented Papua New Guinea national rugby league team at the 2013 World Cup.

Playing career
He plays for the Port Moresby Vipers in PNG as a fullback.

References

1987 births
Living people
Papua New Guinean rugby league players
Papua New Guinean sportsmen
Papua New Guinea national rugby league team players
Rugby league fullbacks
Port Moresby Vipers players